Rule G is a 1915 American comedy silent film directed by George W. Lawrence and G.M. Noble and written by Rufus Steele. The film stars Harry L. Stevenson, Lawrence Katzenberg, A.C. Posey, Paul Gillette, Jack O'Connor and Kathleen Emerson. The film was released on March 4, 1915, by Paramount Pictures.

Plot

Cast 
Harry L. Stevenson as Sandy Weston
Lawrence Katzenberg as Spike Lacey
A.C. Posey as Ned Douglas
Paul Gillette as Neil Atterbury
Jack O'Connor as Silent Smith
Kathleen Emerson as Myra Weston

References

External links 
 

1915 films
1910s English-language films
Silent American comedy films
1915 comedy films
Paramount Pictures films
American black-and-white films
American silent feature films
1910s American films